Secret Harbour is an outer southern suburb of Perth, the capital city of Western Australia, located within the City of Rockingham on the Indian Ocean coast at Comet Bay. Despite its name, Secret Harbour does not have a harbour. The name results from a failed marina development and was approved in 1984.

Facilities 
The Whistling Kite restaurant, bar and bottle shop is located behind the Secret Harbour Shopping Centre, and is a well known social meeting place in the suburb and its surrounds. Adjacent to The Whistling Kite is a gym and pharmacist specialising in nutritional supplements.

The Secret Harbour Golf Course is an 18-hole links course which was designed by Graham Marsh and is part of the "Golf Coast" group of courses.

Secret Harbour Surf Beach is patrolled by lifesavers on weekends and public holidays from October through to March. During December and January the beach is patrolled by lifeguards on weekdays.

Future development
Satterley has released two new land developments since 2008. These are the Spy Glass Hill development, and the future planned beach front development, including two-to-three-story townhouses, a five-story apartment complex, and a gated community. Satterley is also looking at releasing land in the beach front district for the building of restaurants and cafes.

Demographics
Of these, 64.27% had been born in Australia, whilst 21.90% were born in the United Kingdom. The median age of the suburb's residents was 30 years, compared to 37 for both the Perth region and Australia generally.

Secret Harbour is rated by the Australian Bureau of Statistics' 2006 SEIFA index as a higher socio-economic area, with an index of 1097 (92nd percentile) for overall relative advantage/disadvantage. This is consistent with the median individual income of $624 per week and the median household income of $1,541 per week, compared to $513 and $1,086 respectively across metropolitan Perth. A much greater percentage of Secret Harbour's residents (22.5%) worked as Technicians and Trades Workers compared to the regional average (16.0%), and the SEIFA data for Education/Occupation placed Secret Harbour in the 67th percentile. Secret Harbour has been described as the FIFO capital of Perth.

Education
Secret Harbour contains two state primary schools: Secret Harbour Primary School, which opened in 1997, and Comet Bay Primary School in the suburb's southeast, which opened in 2007. Additionally, a state high school, Comet Bay College, opened in 2006 and serves students from the entire district.

Transport
Secret Harbour is connected to Rockingham to the north and Mandurah to the south by Mandurah Road, which forms the suburb's eastern boundary and is part of the national Highway 1 network. Additionally, Warnbro Sound Avenue provides suburban access to Port Kennedy, Waikiki, Warnbro Fair and Rockingham shopping centres.

Several Transperth bus routes terminate at Comet Bay College and provide connections to Rockingham railway station. The 558/559 operates along Warnbro Sound Avenue in the suburb's centre, whilst the 561 serves the western part of the suburb and the 563 serves the eastern part. Additionally, the 558 connects to Mandurah railway station. All buses are operated by Transdev.

Politics
Secret Harbour is part of the federal seat of Brand, currently held by Labor's Madeleine King since the 2016 election, and the state seat of Warnbro, currently held by Labor's Paul Papalia since the 2008 election. Secret Harbour is also part of the Coastal Ward of the City of Rockingham, currently represented by Brian Warner.

Typical of many newer suburbs in Perth, Secret Harbour is not safe for either the Labor or Liberal parties at either state or federal level, though recent elections have seen party preferences diverging - preferring Liberal federally and Labor at the state level. Additionally, at the 2001 state election, the booth had 987 valid votes cast, whilst in 2008 it had 2,599 and 2013 3,610 voters.

References 

Suburbs of Perth, Western Australia
Suburbs in the City of Rockingham